Lee Min-kyu (born 6 January 1989) is a South Korean football defender. He previously played for Gangwon FC and Chungju Hummel in the K League.

Club career
After completing his university education at Hongik University, Lee was placed on the 2011 intake of the K League draft. Joining Gangwon FC as their fourth choice pick, his first game for his new club was as a starter in the second round match of the 2011 K-League Cup against the Chunnam Dragons. Four days later on 10 April, Lee made his debut in the K League itself, playing in Gangwon's 1–0 loss to Ulsan Hyundai.

Club career statistics

References

External links

1989 births
Living people
South Korean footballers
Association football defenders
Gangwon FC players
Chungju Hummel FC players
K League 1 players
K League 2 players
Hongik University alumni